In convex analysis and mathematical optimization, the supporting functional is a generalization of the supporting hyperplane of a set.

Mathematical definition 

Relation to support function 
If  (where  is the dual space of ) is a support function of the set C, then if , it follows that  defines a supporting functional  of C at the point  such that  for any .

Relation to supporting hyperplane 
If  is a supporting functional of the convex set C at the point  such that

References 

Functional analysis
Duality theories
Types of functions